Behind the Burly Q is a 2010 film documentary examining the golden age of American burlesque in the first half of the 20th century.

Synopsis
 
This documentary film about the heyday of burlesque includes interviews with exotic dancers of the time April March, Lorraine Lee, Taffy O’Neill, Blaze Starr, Tempest Storm, and Kitty West; Mike Iannucci, stripper Ann Corio's husband and producer of “This Was Burlesque”; journalists and authors Nat Bodian, Rachel Schteir, and Janet Davis; and actor Alan Alda, whose father Robert Alda was a burlesque singer and straight man.

Reception
Film review aggregator Rotten Tomatoes reports that 78% of critics gave the film a positive review, based on 27 reviews, with an average score of 6.5/10. Emily Hourican of the Irish Independent lauded the film as "an absorbing, moving and cleverly constructed look at the tradition of American burlesque." Roger Ebert of the Chicago Sun-Times was less enthusiastic, claiming the film "settles too easily for an editing formula which alternates talking heads, too cursory performance footage and montages of headlines and photographs." Ronnie Scheib of Variety said the film's "stories run from raunchy to touching to funny to flat-out incredible.”

Book
In 2013, Skyhorse Publishing released a companion book by Zemeckis, also called Behind the Burly Q.

References

External links

 

2010 films
2010s English-language films
American documentary films
Burlesque
2010 documentary films
Documentary films about entertainers
2010s American films